Oliver James Mark Tress (born May 1967) is a British businessman and the founder and head of the UK retail chain Oliver Bonas. He was educated at Marlborough College and Durham University, after which he opened the first Oliver Bonas store in London in 1993. As of 2019, there are 85 Oliver Bonas stores in the UK. In 2009 he married Gina Coladangelo.

Early life
Tress was born in Henley-on-Thames, Oxfordshire, in May 1967, the son of a banker father and housewife mother. He was educated at Marlborough College, Wiltshire, after which he took a degree in anthropology at Durham University, graduating in 1989 as a member of Hatfield College.

Career
Tress opened the first Oliver Bonas store on London's Fulham Road in 1993 selling handbags and jewellery from Hong Kong, where his parents lived. Bonas was the surname of his then-girlfriend Anna (cousin of Prince Harry's ex-girlfriend Cressida Bonas).

In 2011, during the London riots, he was "badly beaten by looters" outside an Oliver Bonas store on Clapham's Northcote Road, and received hospital treatment for head injuries.

In 2019, Tress obtained a £15m revolving credit facility from HSBC, which allowed Oliver Bonas to open eight more stores. As of 2019, there were 85 Oliver Bonas stores in the UK.

Personal life
In 2009, he married Gina Coladangelo. Tress and Coladangelo have three children. In 2015, they moved from Clapham Junction to a five-bedroom Edwardian house in Wandsworth, London with a live-in nanny. She was a director and major stakeholder for the PR and lobbying firm Luther Pendragon, and the marketing and communications director for Oliver Bonas. Later she became a non-executive director at the Department of Health and Social Care, an aide to the then Secretary for Health and Social Care Matt Hancock. In June 2021, Hancock resigned after images were released showing him kissing and embracing Coladangelo in his Whitehall office breaking the then COVID-19 social distancing restrictions. It was later reported that they had separated from their spouses to form a relationship.

References

External links
 Oliver Tress: Who is Gina Coladangelo's husband? - report by the Evening Standard, published 29 June 2021 

1967 births
Living people
British retail company founders
People educated at Marlborough College
Alumni of Hatfield College, Durham
British company founders
British chief executives
People from Henley-on-Thames